The Communauté de communes de Saint-Saëns-Porte de Bray  was located in the Seine-Maritime département of the Normandy region of northern France. It was created in January 1994. It was the first “Communauté de communes” to be created in the region. It was merged into the new Communauté de communes Bray-Eawy in January 2017.

Participants 
The Communauté de communes comprised the following communes:

Bosc-Bérenger
Bosc-Mesnil
Bradiancourt
Critot
Fontaine-en-Bray
Mathonville
Maucomble
Montérolier
Neufbosc
Rocquemont
Sainte-Geneviève
Saint-Martin-Osmonville
Saint-Saëns
Sommery
Ventes-Saint-Rémy

See also
 Communes of the Seine-Maritime department

Notes 

Saint-Saens-Porte de Bray